Schönfließ or Schönfliess refers to:
 Schönfließ railway station in Brandenburg, Germany
 Schönfließ, the German name of Komsomolskoye Microdistrict, Kaliningrad, Russia
 Schönfließ, the German name of Przydwórz, Poland
 Bad Schönfließ, the German name of Trzcińsko-Zdrój, Poland

German words and phrases